The 2015 O'Byrne Cup is a Gaelic football competition played by the teams of Leinster GAA. The competition differs from the Leinster Senior Football Championship as it also features further education colleges and the winning team does not progress to another tournament at All-Ireland level. The O'Byrne Cup began on 3 January 2015 and was competed on a round robin basis, the top team in each group qualifying for the semi-finals. Dublin were the winners.

Group A

Group B

Group C

Group D

Semi-finals

Final

References

External links

O'Byrne Cup
O'Byrne Cup